The International Society of Audiology (ISA) was founded in 1952 to "facilitate the knowledge, protection and rehabilitation of human hearing" and to "serve as an advocate for the profession and for the hearing impaired throughout the world".  It serves as the professional association for those who work in audiology and related fields of knowledge, from all over the world. The ISA is constituted as a corporate body by Article 60 et seq, of the Swiss Civil Code, registered in the Swiss register du Commerce de Genève.

The ISA strives to promote interactions among societies, associations and organizations that have similar missions.  It works towards this goal by focusing on three main activities:

 organizing a biannual world congresses
 publishing the scientific peer-reviewed International Journal of Audiology and
 supporting the World Health Organization by advancing the interests of those working in audiology or related fields, the hearing impaired and deaf community.

Affiliate societies 
Regional, state, provincial, or national societies in which members engage in clinical, research, or teaching of some aspect of audiology can apply to become an Affiliate society of the International Society. Affiliate societies are entitled to appoint representatives to the ISA General Assembly based on a formula of  one representative for each twenty-five (25) fully paid up members of the International Society of Audiology.

See also 

 World Hearing Day
 International Journal of Audiology

References

External links 

 International Society of Audiology
 World Health Organization Prevention of Deafness and Hearing Disorders
Statute of the International Society of Audiology
World Hearing Forum, World Health Organization

Audiology organizations
Audiology